Paweł Maciej Szefernaker (born 27 February 1987) is Secretary of State in the Chancellery of the Prime Minister of Poland. He is also a Member of the Sejm, and used to head the Law and Justice Youth Forum. Szefernaker was included on the New Europe 100 list.

References

1987 births
Living people
Law and Justice politicians
Polish people of German descent
Politicians from Szczecin
Members of the Polish Sejm 2015–2019
Members of the Polish Sejm 2019–2023